The 2002 Vuelta a Andalucía was the 48th edition of the Vuelta a Andalucía (Ruta del Sol) cycle race and was held on 17 February to 21 February 2002. The race started in Huelva and finished in Granada. The race was won by Antonio Colom.

Teams
Twenty teams of eight riders started the race:

 
 
 
 
 
 
 Team Nürnberger Versicherung

General classification

References

Vuelta a Andalucia
Vuelta a Andalucía by year
2002 in Spanish sport